The 1973–74 Hellenic Football League season was the 21st in the history of the Hellenic Football League, a football competition in England.

Premier Division 

The Premier Division featured 13 clubs which competed in the division last season, along with four new clubs, promoted from Division One:
Burnham
Ernest Turners Sports
Hazells
Thatcham

League table

Division One 

The Division One featured 11 clubs which competed in the division last season, along with 10 new clubs:

2 clubs relegated from the Premier Division:
Morris Motors
Newbury Town

7 clubs promoted from Division Two:
Walcot
Maidenhead Social
Wroughton
Easington Sports
Aston Clinton
Watlington
Abingdon United

Plus:
Oxford City reserves

League table

References

External links 
 Hellenic Football League

1973-74
H